Bruzzo is a surname. Notable people with the surname include:

Alicia Bruzzo (1945–2007), Argentine actress
Michele Bruzzo (born 1999), Italian footballer

See also
Bruzzi